Karl Astel (26 February 1898 – 4 April 1945) was an Alter Kämpfer, rector of the University of Jena, a racial scientist, and also involved in the German Nazi Eugenics program.

He was born on 26 February 1898 in Schweinfurt. After finishing the Gymnasium he fought in World War I in 1917 and 1918. Astel took part at the Kapp Putsch and also the Beer Hall Putsch, as a member of the Freikorps Oberland.

Astel studied medicine in Würzburg and earned his PhD around 1930. He was educated and then approved as a sports teacher in March 1926. Astel was employed by the Technical University Munich as a sports advisor.

He was also involved in the anti-tobacco movement. After Karl Astel became rector of the University of Jena in 1939 he tried to form the ideal SS-university ("SS-Muster-Universität"). Astel and his like-minded comrades like Heinz Brücher, Gerhard Heberer, Victor Julius Franz, Johann von Leers and Lothar Stengel-von Rutkowski considered Ernst Haeckel as their forerunner.

On 4 April 1945, Karl Astel shot himself in a hospital (that was headed by the rheumatologist Wolfgang Veil).

Timeline
1920s Freikorps member
1923 Involved in the Beer Hall Putsch
1930 Joined the Nazi Party
1930s
 German Society for Race Hygenie
 SA Reich Leadership Academy
 Worked in the RuSHA (Race and Resettlement Office of the SS)
 Compiled a 'databank' on people to help with 'excluding'
1933 Thuringia Regional Bureau Race Affairs, Weimar
1934 Professor & Director, University Institute for Breeding Theory and Heredity Research in Jena
1936 director Health and Welfare Issues, Thuringia
1934–1937 'in charge' of the Hereditary Health Supreme Court
1939 Rector, University of Jena
1945 Committed suicide in Jena

Bibliography 
 Twilight of the Races (Doom of the Races, cf. Götterdämmerung) and overcoming it by Spirit and Deed as the vital question for the White Nations,  Zentralverlag der NSDAP. Franz Eher Nachfolger Verlag, Munich 1935 (German title: Rassendämmerung und ihre Meisterung durch Geist und Tat als Schicksalsfrage der weißen Völker.)
 Different Reproduction. Examination of the Reproduction of 12.000 bureaucrats and clerks of the Thuringian public administration,  together with Erna Weber, Lehmanns Verlag, Munich, 1939 (German title: Die unterschiedliche Fortpflanzung. Untersuchung über die Fortpflanzung von 12000 Beamten und Angestellten der Thüringischen Staatsverwaltung.)

See also
Nazi Eugenics
Anti-tobacco movement in Nazi Germany

Notes

External links
 Photograph of Karl Astel, Server of the Universität Jena, Astel presents an award after a sports competition

1898 births
1945 deaths
People from Schweinfurt
People from the Kingdom of Bavaria
German geneticists
German military personnel of World War I
Nazi Party politicians
Nazis who participated in the Beer Hall Putsch
SS personnel
Militant League for German Culture members
University of Würzburg alumni
Academic staff of the University of Jena
20th-century Freikorps personnel
Nazis who committed suicide in Germany
Suicides by firearm in Germany
Kapp Putsch participants
1945 suicides